Urian is a Celtic noble male given name (also Urien, Uryen, Uren, presumably derived from British  Urbgen). It is recorded in 1273 in  the Hundred Rolls of Huntingdonshire in a reference to a "John, son of Urian". In the twelfth century Geoffrey of Monmouth used the latinized form Urbianus for the semi-legendary British king Urien.
 
In the modern period, it also occurs as a surname, as Urian.

In German literature
In early modern Germany the expression Herr Urian or Meister Urian denotes a proverbial unwanted guest and figures in works of fiction such as  Matthias Claudius' Urians Reise um die Welt (set by Beethoven as Opus 52, No. 1, 1805, and later by Carl Loewe as Opus 84, 1843),  in the Walpurgisnacht scene of Goethe's Faust, eine Tragödie (1808), where it refers to the devil, and E.T.A. Hoffmann's The Life and Opinions of the Tomcat Murr (1819 -1821).

References

See also
Uriel, the angel
Urania, muse of astronomy
Urian Brereton (died 1577), groom to Henry VIII
Urian Oakes (1631 – 1681), English-born American minister and latinist

Given names